Conopomorpha fustigera is a moth of the family Gracillariidae. It is known from South Africa and Uganda.

The larvae feed on Panicum and Sorghum species. They probably mine the leaves of their host plant.

References

Conopomorpha
Insects of Uganda
Moths of Africa
Moths described in 1928